Joe Faragalli (April 18, 1929 – April 10, 2006) was a gridiron football player and coach who had most of his success in the Canadian Football League (CFL).  Faragalli played guard at Villanova University from 1950 to 1953, and was the team captain all four years. He was drafted by the Chicago Bears in the 12th round (138th overall pick) of the 1954 NFL Draft. He served four years in Germany with the United States Army and went on to coach college football in the United States.

Coaching career
Known affectionately throughout the CFL as "Papa Joe," Faragalli joined the Winnipeg Blue Bombers in 1967 as an offensive coach. In 1981, he became head coach of the Saskatchewan Roughriders and was awarded the Annis Stukus Trophy as Coach of the Year; the team, 2–14 in each of the preceding two seasons, finished with a 9–7 record in 1981 (despite this, the team narrowly missed the playoffs). Faragalli was replaced by Reuben Berry in 1983 after Saskatchewan got off to a 1–5 start to the season.

Faragalli's greatest CFL coaching achievement, in 1987, almost never happened. He began that year as coach of the Montreal Alouettes, but the franchise ceased operations days before the start of the season. After Jackie Parker resigned as Edmonton Eskimos coach two games into the year due to health reasons, Faragalli was hired and led the team to a Grey Cup win against the Toronto Argonauts. 

The Eskimos played in the 1990 Grey Cup game under Faragalli, but lost to Winnipeg. He coached the Ottawa Rough Riders in 1991. After departing from the Eskimos in 1990, he served as the offensive co-ordinator for the World League of American Football's Montreal Machine in 1991 and 1992, in between that one season in Ottawa.

During the 1980s and early 1990s, he worked as an assistant coach with the Cincinnati Bengals, Houston Oilers, Buffalo Bills and the WLAF's Montreal Machine. His son Mike also coached in the CFL.

Faragalli died in Narragansett, Rhode Island on April 10, 2006, of heart failure eight days before his 77th birthday and approximately one month before his 50th wedding anniversary.

Head coaching record

CFL

References

1929 births
2006 deaths
Brown Bears football coaches
Buffalo Bills coaches
Cincinnati Bengals coaches
Edmonton Elks coaches
Houston Oilers coaches
Marshall Thundering Herd football coaches
Montreal Alouettes coaches
Oklahoma State Cowboys football coaches
Ottawa Rough Riders coaches
Saskatchewan Roughriders coaches
Villanova Wildcats football players
Winnipeg Blue Bombers coaches
NFL Europe (WLAF) coaches
Sportspeople from Philadelphia
Players of American football from Philadelphia
United States Army soldiers